Philip B. Krinkie (born February 3, 1950) is an American politician from the state of Minnesota.

Krinkie is from Shoreview, Minnesota. He owns a heating and air-conditioning business and is a member of the board of trustees for the Minnesota State Colleges and Universities System. He served as the president of the Taxpayers League of Minnesota, until he resigned to run for Congress.

Born in Maplewood, Minnesota, Krinkie went to Minnehaha Academy High School. He then received his bachelor's degree from Coe College in 1975.

References

1950 births
Living people
Republican Party members of the Minnesota House of Representatives
People from Maplewood, Minnesota
People from Shoreview, Minnesota
Coe College alumni
Businesspeople from Minnesota